Hakea megalosperma, commonly known as Lesueur hakea, is a shrub of the genus Hakea native to a small area along the west coast in the Wheatbelt region of Western Australia. It is a small shrub with sweetly fragrant white or pink flowers, darkening as they age to red and thick egg-shaped bluish-green leaves.

Description
The leaves have a mid-vein, smooth margin and end sometimes with a curling apex. Flowering occurs from May to June.

Taxonomy and naming
Hakea megalosperma was first formally described by Carl Meisner in 1855 and the description was published in Hooker's Journal of Botany and Kew Garden Miscellany. The specific epithet megalosperma is derived from the Greek "referring to the large seeds".

Distribution and habitat
Lesueur hakea is a rare and endangered species growing on lateritic sand plains in low heathland from Jurien Bay to Mount Lesueur Western Australia.

References

megalosperma
Eudicots of Western Australia
Plants described in 1855